Tapinator, Inc., founded in 2000, is a mobile game app developer and publisher headquartered in New York City, with product development and marketing teams located in North America, Europe, and Asia. Tapinator generates revenues through the sale of branded advertisements and App Store transactions. Since its founding, Tapinator has published more than 300 mobile games.

History 
Tapinator was founded in 2013 and became publicly listed in June 2014 under the ticker symbol TAPM. The Tapinator team had previously founded Familybuilder, Inc., the developer of the Family Tree application on Facebook, which was acquired by Intelius in 2011. In November 2014, Tapinator acquired InAppFuel, Inc., a developer of a patented minigame software for mobile game publishers.

On December 31, 2019, Tapinator announced a 1-for-160 reverse stock split.

Games and Apps

References

Video game companies of the United States